John Johnson (1809 – 5 August 1877) was an English first-class cricketer.

Johnson was born in Nottingham in 1809 and was by profession a solicitor. His interest in cricket began when he played as a schoolboy, and he later made two appearances in first-class cricket for Nottingham in 1848, with both appearances coming against Sheffield. Johnson was the honorary secretary of a number of Nottingham based cricket clubs, and in 1859 he became the honorary secretary of Nottinghamshire County Cricket Club, a post he held for ten years. During his tenure, he was instrumental in the construction of the first pavilion at Trent Bridge. After retiring, he was appointed vice-president to Nottinghamshire County Cricket Club. Johnson died on 5 August 1877 at Bassingfield, Nottinghamshire. Having amassed a large collection of books on cricket during his lifetime, upon his death he left his collection to Richard Daft.

References

External links

1809 births
1877 deaths
Cricketers from Nottingham
English solicitors
English cricketers
Nottingham Cricket Club cricketers
English cricket administrators
19th-century English lawyers
19th-century British businesspeople